Oscar Rudolph (April 2, 1911 – February 1, 1991) was an American film and television director, producer, and actor.

Life and career
Rudolph was born in Cleveland, Ohio, and in 1924 moved to Southern California with his family. He started his Hollywood entertainment career as a bit actor at the age of 14. His first film was Little Annie Rooney (1925), which starred legendary silent film actress Mary Pickford. He appeared in a total of 36 films in mostly uncredited or bit roles from 1925 to 1947, when he appeared in his last role in the film Easy Come, Easy Go.

Rudolph was a director from the early 1940s to the mid 1970s. He began  as an assistant director on a number of films throughout the 1940s and then made the transition to the burgeoning genre of television in the 1950s. He was supervising the second unit of The Flight of the Phoenix when stunt pilot Paul Mantz was killed in a crash in July 1965.

Rudolph directed episodes of more than 500 television shows, including The Donna Reed Show, The Lone Ranger, McHale's Navy, The Phyllis Diller Show, My Favorite Martian, Batman, and The Brady Bunch. His film credits as director included Rocket Man (1954), Twist Around the Clock (1961), and Don't Knock the Twist (1962).

Death
Rudolph died at Encino Hospital Medical Center in Encino, California of complications following a stroke. He was survived by his wife of 53 years, Sylvia; son Alan Rudolph, a film director, screenwriter and producer; and a daughter.

Partial filmography
Little Annie Rooney (1925)
So This Is College (1929)
Their Own Desire (1929)
Divorce in the Family (1932)
This Day and Age (1933)
College Scandal (1935)
The Rocket Man (1954)
Twist Around the Clock (1961)
Don't Knock the Twist (1962)
The Wild Westerners (1962)

References

External links

1911 births
1991 deaths
20th-century American male actors
American television directors
Television producers from Ohio
American male screenwriters
American male child actors
Male actors from Cleveland
Film directors from Ohio
20th-century American businesspeople
Screenwriters from Ohio
Film producers from Ohio
20th-century American male writers
20th-century American screenwriters